Billy Mavreas (born August 14, 1968) is a Canadian cartoonist and artist living in Montreal, Quebec, Canada whose mostly silent or wordless comics revolve around the themes of language, sexuality and spirituality.  He is of Greek descent from the region of Mani.

His posters, featuring otherworldly creatures, especially bunnies, influenced by the psychedelic art stylings of San Francisco artists such as Rick Griffin and Victor Moscoso, figured strongly in the Montreal literary and spoken word scene of the 1990s.

Since 2004, Mavreas has been a regular cartoonist for ascent magazine, a Canadian yoga magazine, and Matrix magazine, a literary review based in Montreal.

Mavreas is also the editor of the comics anthology Monster Island, acting as publisher of the first two issues, while the third issue was published by Conundrum Press. Monster Island III is notable for including some of the last work by Hall of Fame cartoonist Alootook Ipellie.

Books

 Mutations: The Posters Of Billy Mavreas, Conundrum Press, Montreal, 1997
 The Overlords Of Glee, conundrum press & Crunchy Comics, Montreal, 2001
 Inside Outside Overlap, Timeless Books, Kootenay, 2008

Non-cartooning work

 Co-founder of Expozine, Montreal's small press and zine fair
 Keeper of Monastiraki, avant-garde flea market
 Mail art and concrete poetry

References

External links
 yesway blog
 drawrings blog
 Lambiek Comiclopedia entry
 Expozine

Canadian cartoonists
Canadian comics artists
Canadian comics writers
Canadian people of Greek descent
Artists from Montreal
Writers from Montreal
1968 births
Living people
Place of birth missing (living people)
Anglophone Quebec people